Kircher is a surname. Notable people with the surname include:

Al Kircher (1909–2004),  American football, basketball, and baseball player and coach
Alexander Kircher (1867–1939), Austrian-German marine and landscape painter and illustrator
Armin Kircher (1966–2015), Austrian composer
Athanasius Kircher (1602–1680), German Jesuit scholar
George Kircher (1887–1949), American baseball player and coach
Herwig Kircher (born 1955), Austrian football player
Jerome Kircher (born 1964), French actor
Knut Kircher (born 1969), German football referee
Mike Kircher (1897–1972),  American baseball player
Pete Kircher (born 1945), English rock/pop drummer
Tim Kircher (born 1999), German football player
William Kircher (born 1958), New Zealand actor

See also
Kircher (crater), lunar impact crater that is located in the south-southwestern part of the Moon